The Latin Grammy Award for Best Portuguese Language Song is an honor presented annually at the Latin Grammy Awards, a ceremony that recognizes excellence and creates a wider awareness of the cultural diversity and contributions of Latin recording artists in the United States and internationally. According to the category description guide for the 13th Latin Grammy Awards, the award is for  "a song must contain at least 51% of the lyrics in Portuguese and must be a new song. Award to the Songwriter(s). Not Eligible: Instrumental recordings and cover songs."

The award was first presented to Djavan for "Acelerou" in 2000. The only songwriter who has won this award more than once is Milton Nascimento, who won twice consecutively in 2003 and 2004. In 2013, "Esse Cara Sou Eu" by Roberto Carlos  and "Um Abraçaço" by Caetano Veloso became the first songs in the category to be nominated for Song of the Year. In 2014, "A Bossa Nova É Foda" by Caetano Veloso was nominated for Song of the Year. From 2000 to 2015, the award category was presented as Best Brazilian Song and was changed to its current name in 2016.

Winners and nominees

2000s

2010s

2020s

References

External links
Official site of the Latin Grammy Awards

 
Song awards
Portuguese Language Song
Songwriting awards